Yenice is a small  village in Dikili district of İzmir Province, Turkey.  It is situated on the western slopes of the mountainous area.  The population of Yenice is 92. as of 2011.

References

Villages in Dikili District